The Tree of Life on Bulgarian Дървото на живота (Darvoto na zhivota) is a Bulgarian historical drama of TV7. Executive producers are Evtim Miloshev and Lyubomir Neikov with new company Dream Team Films. "The Tree of Life" aired in prime-time on TV7, as the first Bulgarian historical series in the recent history of the country. In the series involved some of the most famous Bulgarian actors. Director of the series Todor Chapkanov and responsible operator Lorenzo Senator.

Story 
The story developed after the Independence of Bulgaria - 1908 and ends in 1925 after the Attack in the Church Saint Kral. The action follows the story of a crowded and affluent family background of key Bulgarian history events. In production is entangled many family dramas and wars between family members.

Seasons 

On May 22, 2013 start filming the second season of the series.

Characters 
 Asen Valchev (Iossif Surchadzhiev) - head of the family
 Petruna Valcheva (Maria Kavardzhikova)
 Panto Valchev (Vladimir Karamazov)
 Yordan Valchev (Hristo Shopov) - officer of the Bulgarian army and rebel in Macedonia
 Hristo Valchev (Bashar Rahal)
 Iliya Valchev (Monyo Monev)
 Bela Valcheva (Koyna Ruseva) - wife of Todor
 Todor Lozanchev (Ivan Stamenov) - born in Ohrid, husband of Bela, an officer of the Bulgarian army and rebel in Macedonia
 General Aleksandar Protogerov (Yozif Shamli) - leader of VMRO
 Yana (Luiza Grigorova) - maid in the home of the family Valchevi
 Anastasiya Ingilizova (Evdokia Hadzhikonstantinova)
 Aleksandra Lopez (Azra Alton)
 Bojura (Teodora Duhovnikova)
 Lawyer Kamenov (Vasil Banov)
 Elena Kamemova (Hristina Apostolova) - secretly infatuated by Hristo Valchev
 Fatih (Velislav Pavlov) - Azra's brother, a traitor to the detachment of Todor and Jordan
 Voiceover (Vasil Binev) - heir of the clan Valchevi, telling family history

Original sound track 
The original sound track is created by the Bulgarian composer Georgi Strezov. The series includes the works: "Main Titles", "Todor And Bella", "Family Apart", "Yordan And Azra", "Love", "In the tavern".

References

External links 

Bulgarian television series
2010s Bulgarian television series
2013 Bulgarian television series debuts
2013 Bulgarian television series endings